4-Hydroxy-4-methylpentanoic acid (UMB68) is a tertiary alcohol, similar in structure to the drug GHB. The molecule has been synthesized and tested on animals in order to further research the effects of GHB. UMB68 has been shown to bind selectively to the GHB receptor ligand in binding assays, yet does not bind to GABAergic receptors. As such, it can provide a useful tool in studying the pharmacology of the GHB receptor in absence of GABAergic effects.

References

Tertiary alcohols
Drugs acting on the nervous system
Hydroxy acids
GHB receptor agonists